Peter Donat (born Pierre Collingwood Donat; January 20, 1928 – September 10, 2018) was a Canadian-American actor.

Early life
Pierre Collingwood Donat was born in Kentville, Nova Scotia, Canada, the son of Marie (née Bardet) and Philip Ernst Donat, a landscape gardener. Richard Donat, who starred on the television show Haven, is Peter's younger brother. His uncle was Oscar winning British actor Robert Donat. Peter Donat emigrated to the United States in 1950, studied drama at Yale University, and first came to attention as a stage actor in the lead of a production of Cyrano de Bergerac. In 1961, he played a leading role in Donald Jack's stage play The Canvas Barricade, the first Canadian play performed at the Stratford Festival.

Career
In 1965, he was featured in the cast as Vince Conway on Moment of Truth. That series was the only Canadian serial ever broadcast on a commercial television network in the United States.

His credits include: Mission: Impossible, Banacek, The Waltons, Hawaii Five-O, Mannix, Charlie's Angels, Lou Grant, Baa Baa Black Sheep, Captains and the Kings, Rich Man, Poor Man Book II, The Feather and Father Gang, The Eddie Capra Mysteries, Dallas, Quincy, M.E., Hart to Hart, Hill Street Blues, Simon & Simon, Murder, She Wrote, and the 1976 series Sara. He also starred in Cyrano de Bergerac playing the title role, in 1974 on the PBS anthology Theatre in America. He was a regular cast member of the 1980s primetime serial, Flamingo Road as Elmo Tyson, in 1993 on the series Time Trax as the antagonist Dr. Mordecai Sahmbi, and more recently had a recurring role as Bill Mulder, Agent Mulder's father, in The X-Files.

Donat also worked extensively in films. Some of his more prominent roles included The Godfather Part II (1974), The Hindenburg (1975), F.I.S.T. (1978), The China Syndrome (1979), The War of the Roses (1989), Skin Deep (1989) and The Game (1997). Donat was a prominent member of the American Conservatory Theater (ACT) in San Francisco for a number of years. He was also active in local theater, most notably playing his first singing role as Professor Higgins in the 1988 Cabrillo Stage production of My Fair Lady.

Personal life
Donat was married to actress Michael Learned from 1956 until 1972, when they divorced. They had three children — Caleb, Christopher and Lucas. From 1983 until his death, he was married to his second wife, Marijke. He was a naturalized United States citizen.  He also narrated the biographical film chronicling the life and work of famed mythologist Joseph Campbell, The Hero's Journey: A Biographical Portrait (1987) and moderated the multi-volume video series, The World of Joseph Campbell: Transformation of Myths Through Time (1989), giving insightful commentary and celebrating Campbell's brilliance as a scholar and storyteller.

Donat died at his home in Point Reyes Station, California, on September 10, 2018, due to complications of diabetes.

Filmography
 1958 Lost Lagoon as David Burnham
 1967 Der Revolver des Korporals as Hilario
 1971 My Old Man's Place as Car Salesman
 1973 The Waltons (TV Series, episode: The Prize) as Oscar Cockrell
 1974 The Godfather Part II as Questadt
 1974 The Missiles of October (TV movie) as David Ormsby-Gore
 1975 Russian Roulette as McDermott
 1975 The Hindenburg as Reed Channing
 1977 Billy Jack Goes to Washington as Ralph Butler
 1977 Delta County, U.S.A. (TV movie) as John McCain Jr.
 1978 Mirrors as Dr. Philip Godard
 1978 F.I.S.T. as Arthur St. Clair
 1978 A Different Story as Sills
 1979 The China Syndrome as Don Jacovich
 1979 Hanging by a Thread (TV movie) as Mr. Durant
 1979 Meteor as The Narrator
 1982 Highpoint as Maronzella
 1982 Ladies and Gentlemen, The Fabulous Stains as Harley Dennis
 1982 Mazes and Monsters (TV movie) as Harold
 1983 I Am Joe's Eye as Voice of Joe's Eye
 1984 The Bay Boy as Will Campbell
 1984 Massive Retaliation as Lee Briscoe
 1985 Honeymoon as Novak
 1987 Unfinished Business as Ferenzy
 1988 Tucker: The Man and His Dream as Otto Kerner
 1989 Skin Deep as "Sparky"
 1989 The War of the Roses as Jason Larrabee
 1992 The Babe as Harry Frazee
 1992 School Ties as Headmaster Dr. Bartram
 1997 The Game as Samuel Sutherland
 1997 Red Corner as David McAndrews
 2001 The Deep End as Jack Hall
 2001 Never Die Twice
 2003 Murder, She Wrote: The Celtic Riddle as Eamon Byrne

References

External links
 
 
 
Peter Donat at Northernstars.ca

1928 births
2018 deaths
American male film actors
American male stage actors
American male television actors
American male voice actors
Canadian male film actors
Canadian emigrants to the United States
Canadian male stage actors
Canadian male television actors
Canadian male voice actors
Canadian people of English descent
People from Kentville, Nova Scotia
Yale School of Drama alumni